Barry T. Tallackson (born April 14, 1983) is an American former ice hockey forward. He played 20 games in the National Hockey League with the New Jersey Devils between 2005 and 2009, mainly playing for their American Hockey League affiliate. Tallackson later spent 7 seasons in the Deutsche Eishockey Liga, and last played for the Oji Eagles of the Asia League Ice Hockey (ALIH).

Playing career
Prior to being drafted into the NHL in 2002, Tallackson played for the Minnesota Golden Gophers and won a national championship.

Tallackson was drafted by the New Jersey Devils in the 2nd round, 53rd overall, on June 22, 2002. In December 2008 the Devil's waived their rights to the forward, just weeks after he underwent surgery to correct an irregular heartbeat associated with Wolff-Parkinson-White syndrome. He played with the Devil's farm team Lowell Devils where he scored 11 goals and 10 assists prior to being signed as a free agent by the St. Louis Blues on July 22, 2009.

Tallackson soon was released by St. Louis and later signed with Augsburger Panthers in Germany on July 17, 2010.

On May 2, 2011, after one season with Augsburg, Tallackson signed with reigning champions, Eisbären Berlin, on a one-year contract.

Tallackson's season with the Eisbären saw him finish second in points and goals on the DEL championship winning Eisbären team. Tallackson won MVP of the final series of the playoffs, and saw his contract extended with the Eisbären for another season.

Career statistics

Regular season and playoffs

International

References

External links

1983 births
Living people
Albany River Rats players
American men's ice hockey right wingers
Augsburger Panther players
Eisbären Berlin players
Ice hockey players from Minnesota
Ice hockey people from North Dakota
Lowell Devils players
Minnesota Golden Gophers men's ice hockey players
New Jersey Devils draft picks
New Jersey Devils players
Oji Eagles players
People from Detroit Lakes, Minnesota
People from Walsh County, North Dakota
Peoria Rivermen (AHL) players
USA Hockey National Team Development Program players
NCAA men's ice hockey national champions